Pomaderris angustifolia is a species of flowering plant in the family Rhamnaceae and is endemic to south-eastern continental Australia. It is a shrub with linear to narrowly oblong leaves and cream-coloured or yellow flowers.

Description
Flowering occurs from October to November.

Taxonomy
Pomaderris angustifolia was first formally described in 1951 by Norman Arthur Wakefield in The Victorian Naturalist from specimens he collected near the "Upper Genoa River" in 1948. The specific epithet (angustifolia) means "narrow-leaved".

Distribution and habitat
This pomaderris usually grows in rocky soils in gullies near watercourses and occurs in New South Wales on the ranges south from near Rylstone through the Australian Capital Territory to eastern Victoria as far west as Maffra.

References

angustifolia
Flora of the Australian Capital Territory
Flora of New South Wales
Flora of Victoria (Australia)
Taxa named by Norman Arthur Wakefield
Plants described in 1951